Vicki Trickett (September 2, 1938 – August 30, 2021) was an American actress best known for several film roles in the early 1960s. She is probably best known for her role as Diane Quigley in the film The Three Stooges Meet Hercules (1962).

Career
Born in Kansas City, Kansas, Trickett was the eldest of five children and daughter of professional golfer, L.G. Trickett. Before entering the entertainment business, Trickett attended Omaha University (now the University of Nebraska at Omaha) for a year, majoring in Chemistry and Spanish. At OU she was named Miss Auto Show of 1959 and was third runner up in the Tomahawk Beauty Queen Pageant 1959. In 1959, she competed in the Miss Universe contest as "Miss Omaha."

Tab Hunter discovered her in 1959 after meeting her at a Del Mar horse show. Hunter cast her in two episodes of The Tab Hunter Show . This led to additional television appearances on The Adventures of Ozzie & Harriet. Other film work included The Cabinet of Caligari, Gidget Goes Hawaiian and Pepe.

Following the divorce from her first husband, Trickett left the entertainment industry and returned to live in Omaha, Nebraska.

Awards
Trickett was nominated for a Laurel Award for Top Female New Personality in 1962.

Personal life and death
Trickett has been married three times. She married Richard V. Herre Jr. in 1960 and had one child; they divorced in 1963. Her second marriage was to Donald E. Kennedy in 1963, which also ended in divorce. Trickett married her third husband, James G. Lindblad in August 1972. Trickett died at 82, three days before her 83rd birthday in San Juan Capistrano, California.

Filmography

References

External links

1938 births
2021 deaths
Actresses from Kansas City, Kansas
University of Nebraska Omaha alumni
20th-century American actresses
21st-century American women